Robert James Gorlin (January 11, 1923 – August 29, 2006) was an oral pathologist, human geneticist and academic at the University of Minnesota School of Dentistry.

Biography
Gorlin was born in Hudson, New York. Raised in Newark, New Jersey, Gorlin graduated from Weequahic High School in 1940. After receiving an A.B. degree in 1943 from Columbia University, Gorlin volunteered for the Army, where he was instructed to apply to dental school.  He graduated in 1947 from Washington University School of Dental Medicine in St. Louis, Missouri, and then completed a master's degree in oral pathology from the State University of Iowa (now the University of Iowa), Iowa City, in 1956.

That same year, he joined the faculty at the University of Minnesota School of Dentistry, Minneapolis, as an associate professor and chair of the divisions of oral histology and oral pathology. At the time of his death, he was the UM Regents’ Professor Emeritus of Oral Pathology. He published over 600 articles in a variety of topics, and held joint appointments with the University of Minnesota's departments of pediatric medicine, laboratory medicine and pathology, obstetrics and gynecology, otolaryngology and dermatology.

Gorlin is survived by his children, Jed and Cathy.

Awards
 1961: Guggenheim Fellowship
 1997: Senior Fellow in the Institute of Medicine of the National Academy of Sciences
 1997: Goldhaber Award from Harvard University
 1997: Premio Phoenix Anni Verdi Award, presented by the Italian Medical Genetics Society
 2002: Honorary Doctor of Science, University of Minnesota’s highest honor 
 2003: American Dental Association's Gold Medal Award for Lifetime Achievements 
 2004: American Society of Human Genetics Award for Excellence in Human Genetics Education 
 Five honorary doctorate degrees from universities in Athens, Dublin, and Copenhagen 
 The invited presenter at the Nobel Foundation conference in Stockholm on the topic of genetic signaling in development and disease

See also
 Gorlin sign
 Nevoid basal cell carcinoma syndrome
 Focal dermal hypoplasia

References

1923 births
2006 deaths
People from Hudson, New York
American pathologists
Medical geneticists
Washington University School of Dental Medicine alumni
Physicians from Newark, New Jersey
Weequahic High School alumni
Columbia University alumni
United States Army personnel of World War II
University of Iowa alumni
University of Minnesota faculty
Members of the National Academy of Medicine